The 2003 Porsche Michelin Supercup season was the 11th Porsche Supercup season. The races were all supporting races in the 2003 Formula One season. It travelled to ten circuits across Europe and a double-header at Indianapolis, USA.

Teams and drivers

Race calendar and results

Championship standings

† — Drivers did not finish the race, but were classified as they completed over 90% of the race distance.

References

External links
The Porsche Mobil 1 Supercup website
Porsche Mobil 1 Supercup Online Magazine

Porsche Supercup seasons
Porsche Supercup